Bryocryptellidae is a family of bryozoans belonging to the order Cheilostomatida.

Genera:
 Bryocryptella Cossman, 1906
 Buchneria Harmer, 1957
 Cyclocolposa Canu & Bassler, 1923
 Cystisella Canu & Bassler, 1917
 Marguetta Jullien, 1903
 Palmiskenea Bishop & Hayward, 1989
 Porella Gray, 1848
 Reussia Neviani, 1895
 Rhamphosmittina Hayward & Thorpe, 1988
 Simibryocryptella Alvarez, 1991
 Stoliczkella Zágoršek & Gordon, 2014

References

Bryozoan families